According to the US Bureau of Justice Statistics' 2008 Census of State and Local Law Enforcement Agencies, the state had 48 law enforcement agencies employing 2,828 sworn police officers, about 268 for each 100,000 residents.

State agencies
 Rhode Island Department of Corrections
 Rhode Island Department of Environmental Management
 Division of Law Enforcement
 Rhode Island Department of Public Safety
 Rhode Island State Police
 Rhode Island Capitol Police
 Division of Sheriffs
 Office of the State Fire Marshal
 Rhode Island Office of the Attorney General
 Bureau of Criminal Identification and Investigation

Municipal agencies 

Barrington Police Department
Bristol Police Department
Burrillive Police Department
Central Falls Police Department
Charlestown Police Department
Coventry Police Department
Cranston Police Department
Cumberland Police Department
East Greenwich Police Department
East Providence Police Department
Foster Police Department
Glocester Police Department
Hopkinton Police Department

Jamestown Police Department
Johnston Police Department
Lincoln Police Department
Little Compton Police Department
Middletown Police Department
Narragansett Police Department
Newport Police Department
New Shoreham Police Department
North Kingstown Police Department
North Providence Police Department
North Smithfield Police Department
Pawtucket Police Department
Portsmouth Police Department

Providence Police Department
Richmond Police Department
Scituate Police Department
Smithfield Police Department
South Kingstown Police Department
Tiverton Police Department
Warren Police Department
Warwick Police Department
West Greenwich Police Department
West Warwick Police Department
Westerly Police Department
Woonsocket Police Department

College and university agencies 
 Brown University Department of Public Safety
 Bryant University Department of Public Safety
 Community College of Rhode Island Police Department
 Providence College Office of Public Safety
 Rhode Island College Campus Police Department
 University of Rhode Island Police Department

Other agencies
 Narragansett Indian Tribe Environmental Police Department
 Narragansett Tribal Police Department
 Rhode Island Airport Police

References

Rhode Island
Law enforcement agencies of Rhode Island
Law enforcement agencies